The Becker–Edberg rivalry was a tennis rivalry between Boris Becker and Stefan Edberg, who met 35 times between 1984 and 1996.  Although Becker led their overall head-to-head 25–10 and won all three of their Davis Cup matches, Edberg won three of their four meetings in Grand Slams. Edberg and Becker also reached the championship match of the 1989 World Tour Finals, which Edberg won in four sets.

The most defining aspect of their rivalry was the three successive Wimbledon finals that they played. In the 1988 meeting, Becker was the huge favorite, and stormed to the first set 6–4. The second set was to be the most memorable, when in a fit of courage and tennis acumen Edberg won a tight set in a tiebreaker 7–2. Edberg went on to win the next two sets 6–4, 6–2 to win his first Wimbledon title and deny Becker a third title in four years. In the 1989 meeting, Becker, having lost to Edberg a month earlier in the French Open semifinals, raced to win the first set 6–0. The second set was closer, but won in a tiebreak by Becker 7–1 after saving 3 set points (Edberg led 6-5 40-0 and service).  Becker went on to win the third set 6–4. This was Becker's third Wimbledon title, which would be his last Wimbledon crown. In the 1990 meeting, Edberg won the first two sets 6–2, 6–2. However, Becker rallied to win the next two sets 6–3, 6–3.  Becker broke Edberg early in the fifth set, setting up the possibility of being the first Wimbledon champion  since Henri Cochet in 1927 to win the final after losing the first two sets. Yet, this was not to be as Edberg regained the break and then broke Becker in the ninth game of the set with a topspin lob winner, eventually serving it out for a second Wimbledon championship.

Following his 2009 Wimbledon final (where he broke the all-time record for most men's singles Grand Slam titles), Roger Federer in the post-match press conference cited the Becker–Edberg rivalry in Wimbledon finals as his inspiration for choosing to play tennis over soccer. Becker and Edberg continued their rivalry as coaches through the Djokovic–Federer rivalry, with Becker coaching Novak Djokovic and Edberg coaching Federer starting from the 2014 season. Federer and Edberg parted ways at the end of 2015. Djokovic and Becker split the year after.

Head-to-head

Singles (35)
Becker 25 – Edberg 10

Breakdown of their rivalry
All matches:(35)  Becker 25–10
All finals:  Becker 11–5
Carpet courts: Becker 13–4
Clay courts: Tied 1–1
Grass courts: Becker 4–2
Hard courts: Becker 7–3
Davis Cup matches: Becker 3–0
Grand Slam finals: Edberg 2–1
Grand Slam matches: Edberg 3–1
Masters Series finals: Becker 2–1
Masters Series matches: Becker 2–1
Year-End Championships finals: Edberg 1–0
Year-End Championships matches: Becker 4–2

ATP rankings

Year-end ranking timeline

Combined singles performance timeline (best result)

See also
 List of tennis rivalries

References

External links
 ATP Boris Becker vs Stefan Edberg head 2 head

Tennis rivalries